Bas-Boris Bode is a German and Dutch television series, broadcast in 6 episodes in 1985.

External links
 

1985 German television series debuts
1985 German television series endings
1985 Dutch television series debuts
German-language television shows
ZDF original programming